ICON magazine is a British design and architecture magazine established in 2003 by publishing director Daren Newton.

The title is owned by Media 10 LTD. The current editor is Jessica-Christin Hametner.

In 2020, the magazine changed from a monthly to a quarterly publication.

ICON is part of a wider Media 10 publication and event portfolio that includes OnOffice, Clerkenwell Design Week and Design London.

Awards
Awards won by the magazine include:
 International Building Press awards: magazine of the year (twice), best architectural journalist and best critic
 Magazine Design Awards: best designed business-to-business magazine, and best use of typography

References

External links

Architecture magazines
Design magazines
Visual arts magazines published in the United Kingdom
Magazines established in 2003